Jimmy-Jay Morgan (born 21 January 2006) is an English professional footballer who is a striker at Premier League side Chelsea.

Early life
Morgan joined the academy of Chelsea at the age of eight, before leaving for Southampton three years later due to issues with the commute to the Cobham Training Centre. He was a prolific goal-scorer for Southampton at junior level with 27 goals for Southampton’s Under-16s and 13 more for the Under-18s during the 2021–22 season. Southampton academy coach Louis Carey said Morgan is “one of the best” finishers he had seen in the club’s youth programme.

Career

Southampton
Aged 16, Morgan played for Southampton U21s in three Football League Trophy group stage defeats in August and October 2022. He was named in the first team squad as a substitute for an EFL Cup match against Sheffield Wednesday in November 2022. He was in the first team match day squad again for Southampton on 7 January 2023 for the FA Cup tie away to  Crystal Palace which Southampton won 2–1. In January 2023 reports emerged that Morgan had rejected the offer of a first professional contract at Southampton.

Chelsea
On 31 January 2023, Morgan was reported to have joined Chelsea for an undisclosed fee. This was confirmed on 9 February 2023 by sports website The Athletic, and a day later by Chelsea themselves.

International career
Morgan scored a brace for the England U17 team in consecutive matches in 2022, against Georgia U17 and Israel U17 in qualifying matches for the European U17 Championship, and had a tally of six goals is his first seven matches at that level.

Career statistics

Club
.

References

Living people
2006 births
English footballers
England youth international footballers
Association football forwards
Chelsea F.C. players
Southampton F.C. players